Farxaan Aadan Haybe is the chairman of the Somaliland Civil Service Commission, appointed in March 2019. He was formerly Minister of Aviation.

References

Civil Aviation Ministers of Somaliland
21st-century Somaliland politicians
Year of birth missing (living people)
Living people
Place of birth missing (living people)